The 1980–81 Winnipeg Jets season was the Winnipeg Jets' second season in the National Hockey League. In the 1980-81 season they finished fifth (and last) in the NHL's Smythe Division. The team scored 246 goals and conceded 400 goals. The Jets won 9 games, lost 57 games and tied 14 games.  They scored 32 points.

The Jets were coached by Tom McVie (1 win, 20 losses and 7 ties), Bill Sutherland (6 wins, 20 losses and 3 ties), and Mike Smith (2 wins, 17 losses and 4 ties).

Offseason
The Jets named Morris Lukowich as team captain during the off-season, as former captain Lars-Erik Sjöberg announced his retirement at the end of the 1979-80 season.  Lukowich had been with Winnipeg since their final season in the WHA, helping the club win the Avco Cup in 1979.

On June 11, 1980, Winnipeg selected defenseman Dave Babych with the second overall pick in the 1980 NHL Entry Draft. Babych was a high scoring defenseman with the Portland Winterhawks of the WHL, recording 22 goals and 82 points in 50 games with Portland.  With their second pick, the Jets selected Moe Mantha from the Toronto Marlboros of the OMJHL, and in the seventh round, the team selected Brian Mullen from the United States national ice hockey team.

Winnipeg made a few small trades during the off-season, most notably acquiring Rick Bowness from the St. Louis Blues in exchange for Craig Norwich.  The Jets also acquired Norm Dupont from the Montreal Canadiens for the Jets second round pick in the 1982 NHL Entry Draft.  Dupont was selected by the Canadiens in the first round of the 1977 NHL amateur draft, however, he picked up only a goal and four points in 35 games with Montreal in the 1979-80 season.

Regular season

Final standings

Schedule and results

Playoffs
For the second straight season, the Jets failed to qualify for the playoffs, as they had an NHL worst record of 9-57-14, earning 32 points, 39 points behind the Toronto Maple Leafs for the final playoff position.

Player statistics

Regular season
Scoring

Goaltending

Awards and records

Transactions

Trades

Waivers

Free agents

Draft picks
Winnipeg selected the following players at the 1980 NHL Entry Draft, which was held at the Montreal Forum in Montreal, Quebec on June 11, 1980.

NHL Amateur Draft

Farm teams

See also
1980–81 NHL season

References

External links 
 

Winnipeg Jets season, 1980-81
Winnipeg Jets (1972–1996) seasons
Winn